Philadelphus mexicanus is a shrub belonging to the genus Philadelphus, native to Mexico and Guatemala. 'Rose syringa' (syn. Philadelphus maculatus) is the most commonly cultivated variety and has fragrant white flowers with a purple blotch in the centre.

References

The Hillier Manual of Trees and Shrubs, Ed. John Hillier, David & Charles 2007, 
The Royal Horticultural Society A-Z Encyclopaedia of Garden Plants, Ed. Christopher Bickell, Dorling Kindersley 1996, 

mexicanus